.

William Newton Morgan, Sr. (December 14, 1930 – January 18, 2016) was an American architect and author, based in Jacksonville, Florida. 

One of William Morgan's famous creations is the neo modern house in Ormond Beach, Florida. Built for the Root family, creators of the iconic Coca-Cola bottle and owners of the Coca-Cola Bottling, the building is a luxury oceanfront home.  It consists of two three-story concrete towers connected by two bridges.  It has marvelous metal, glass and stone walls.  Solid copper stairs, transparent brass mesh walls, and exotic wood showcase Morgan's modern architecture.
Morgan won a National Honor Award from the American Institute of Architects (AIA) for this house. 

Morgan grew up in Jacksonville and graduated with a bachelor's degree from Harvard University before serving in the U.S. Navy during the Korean War. After the war he returned to Harvard to study architecture. He studied in Italy on a Fulbright Scholarship (U.S.-Italy Fulbright Commission) and then returned to Jacksonville in 1961 to open his architecture practice in the city where he had grown up.

Three of his designs are included on the Florida Association of the American Institute of Architects list of Florida's top 100 buildings (The Williamson House in Ponte Vedra Beach; Morgan's residence in Atlantic Beach; and Dickinson Hall at the University of Florida, formerly the Museum of Natural History). He has written five books including his most recent, Earth Architecture (2008). In 2012 the University of Florida awarded Morgan an honorary doctor of arts degree as well as the first recipient of its School of Architecture's Lifetime Achievement Award. Morgan has been described as a pioneer of sustainable design.

Morgan's five books cover the architecture of pre-industrial cultures, including those in pre-Columbian North America and Micronesia. He died in Jacksonville after a long illness on January 18, 2016, aged 85.

Works
Work of William N Morgan, FAIA US Modernist
Ocean Shore House
Williamson House, Ponte Vedra Beach (1966), AIA Florida Award of Merit (1964) and listed on AIA's list of Top 100 buildings in Florida
Museum of Science and History (1969), adjacent to Friendship Fountain, formally the Jacksonville Children's Museum
Dickinson Hall (1971) at the University of Florida campus in Gainesville, formerly the Museum of Natural History/ Florida Museum of Natural Sciences. The earth-bermed concrete building is listed on AIA's Top 100 Buildings in Florida
Police Administration Building, Jacksonville 
Daniel State Office Building, Jacksonville (now an annex and parking garage for the Hyatt Regency Riverfront Hotel)
Morgan home, Atlantic Beach (1974), Morgan's home in Atlantic Beach, influenced by the stepped structure of the Roman seaside town Herculaneum Listed on AIA's Top 100 Buildings in Florida

See also
Architecture of Jacksonville

References

21st-century American architects
Writers from Jacksonville, Florida
Harvard Graduate School of Design alumni
Architects from Jacksonville, Florida
20th-century American architectsThe Ocean House
1930 births
2016 deaths
Jacksonville Modern architecture
Brutalist architects
Fulbright alumni